The Ontario Institute for Studies in Education of the University of Toronto (OISE/UT) is Canada's only all-graduate institute of teaching, learning and research, located in Toronto, Ontario. It is located directly above the St. George subway station, with the OISE Jackman Institute of Child Study located on Walmer Street by the Spadina station.

History
OISE/UT traces its origins back to three separate institutions: the Ontario Provincial Normal School, the Faculty of Education at the University of Toronto, and the Ontario Institute for Studies in Education. The Ontario Provincial Normal School was founded in 1847, Provincial Model School in 1848 (later merged into Normal School), renamed the Toronto Normal School in 1875, and renamed again as the Toronto Teachers’ College in 1953. In 1974, the Toronto Teachers’ College was recreated  as the Ontario Teacher Education College which was a degree granting institution, in turn with declining need for teachers it was closed  by the Ontario government in 1979. The University of Toronto's Faculty of Education also underwent a series of name changes, being known as the Faculty of Education, University of Toronto from 1907 to 1920, the Ontario College of Education from 1920 to 1965, the College of Education, University of Toronto from 1965 to 1972, and again as the Faculty of Education in 1972. The Ontario Institute for Studies in Education itself was founded in 1965 by an act of the Ontario Legislature. OISE's primary objectives were to conduct and disseminate research in the field of education, and to offer graduate-level education courses and degrees. In 1996, the University of Toronto's Faculty of Education merged with OISE to form the Ontario Institute for Studies in Education of the University of Toronto.

In 1965, the OISE introduced a masters and doctoral program in adult education. In 1967, OISE introduced the first graduate course in comparative studies in adult education, which was taught by J. R. Kidd.

In 1975 Professor Frank Smith worked with Stephen Rose on the documentary TV programme How Do You Read which was broadcast by the BBC as part of the Horizon TV series.

In 1979, OISE hosted the founding meeting of the Feminist Party of Canada.

Academics
OISE/UT offers graduate programs in teaching, psychology, educational theory, history and administration, and Honours Specialist, technical education diploma, and Additional and Principal Qualification programs. Master of Education and Doctor of Education degrees as well as Master of Arts and Doctor of Philosophy degrees are available. Master of Teaching degrees are also offered. OISE also offers a concurrent education program.

As a result of the government's decision to extend teaching degree programs from existing one year into two years province-wide, OISE announced that they would shift towards graduate programs. By 2015, undergraduate teaching programs were eliminated and OISE became an all-graduate school.

Partnerships
OISE is a founding member of the  International Alliance of Leading Education Institutes, which is an international organization of premier education institutes whose focus and mandate is to explore educational issues of global consequence, particularly in matters of teacher education and educational policy. IALEI membership is selective, limited, and by invitation only, based on a member's status as both a world-leading institute, including its "strength in breadth and depth of staff with exceptional publications and significant impact", and as a regional/national centre of excellence in teacher education and consonant educational research, amongst other criteria.

Notable alumni 
 Zanana Akande - former Ontario NDP MPP
 Father David Bauer, Basilian priest, founder of the Canada men's national ice hockey team and inductee into the Hockey Hall of Fame
 Shaun Chen - former TDSB trustee and chair; current Liberal MP
 Mychael Danna
 Crispin Duenas
 Michael Fullan
 Carrianne Leung
 Christina Mitas - PC MPP for Scarborough Centre
 Amanda Parris
 Kathleen Wynne - former Premier and leader of Ontario Liberal Party
 Jillian Roberts

References

External links

 OISE website
 Self-archived works available on T-Space

Institutes of the University of Toronto
Educational institutions established in 1847
Teachers colleges in Canada
1847 establishments in Canada